Mycalesis terminus, the orange bushbrown, is a species of butterfly in the family Nymphalidae. It is found in Indonesia (Irian Jaya, Maluku), New Guinea and Australia (Queensland).

The wingspan is about 40 mm. Adults are dark brown with a large orange patch on each forewing and an eyespot on each forewing and three on each hindwing. They suck the juice of rotting fruit but have also been recorded feeding on dew and sap.

The larvae feed on various Poaceae species, including Themeda triandra, Panicum maximum, Imperata cylindrica and Oplismenus species. Young larvae feed on the leaftips of their host plant. They are brown with a faint dark dorsal line and obscure diagonal markings. Full-grown larvae reach a length of about 30 mm.

Subspecies
Mycalesis terminus terminus (Cape York to Yeppoon)
Mycalesis terminus remulia (Cramer, [1779]) (Ambon, Serang, Obi)
Mycalesis terminus wakolo Fruhstorfer, 1908 (Buru)
Mycalesis terminus pseudasophis Fruhstorfer, 1908 (Bachan)
Mycalesis terminus anteros Fruhstorfer, 1908 (Halmahera)
Mycalesis terminus ternatensis Fruhstorfer, 1908 (Ternate)
Mycalesis terminus atropates Fruhstorfer, 1908 (West Irian: Dore Bay)
Mycalesis terminus terminulus Fruhstorfer, 1908 (Waigeu)
Mycalesis terminus flagrans Butler, 1876 (Papua New Guinea)
Mycalesis terminus matho Grose-Smith, 1894 (Bismarck Archipelago)

References

Butterflies described in 1775
Mycalesis
Butterflies of Indonesia
Taxa named by Johan Christian Fabricius